Joseph Michael Federspiel  (born May 6, 1950) is a former American football middle linebacker who played ten seasons in the National Football League (NFL).  Federspiel played college football at the University of Kentucky.

Federspiel played in the NFL for the New Orleans Saints (1972–1980) and Baltimore Colts in 1981. 
Federspiel also played for the Chicago Blitz of the United States Football League in 1983.

After retiring as a player, Federspiel officiated Southeastern Conference (SEC) football games as an umpire. He was not allowed to work Kentucky games, as SEC rules prohibit officials from calling games involving their alma mater.

References

1950 births
Living people
American football linebackers
College football officials
Baltimore Colts players
Chicago Blitz players
Kentucky Wildcats football players
New Orleans Saints players
Players of American football from Louisville, Kentucky